Hirapur is a village in Ambedkar Nagar district, Uttar Pradesh, India.
 
There are 5 schools in Hirapur. There is a Bank of Baroda branch in Hirapur.

See also
 Tanda
 Rajesultanpur
 Akbarpur
 Jalalpur
 Baskhari
 Hanswar
 Akhilesh Upadhyay Development officer LIC Tanda/Baskhari

References

Villages in Ambedkar Nagar district